John Hickman may refer to:

John Hickman (diplomat), British ambassador; see List of ambassadors of the United Kingdom to Chile
John Hickman (musician) (1942–2021), American banjo player with Byron Berline
John Hickman (Pennsylvania politician) (1810–1875), U.S. Representative from Pennsylvania, 1855–1863
John Hickman (sailor) (1837–1904), American Civil War sailor and Medal of Honor recipient
John W. Hickman (born 1939), American politician from Utah
John Hickman (meteorologist) (1927–2014), New Zealand meteorologist
Johnny Hickman (born 1959), musician with Cracker
John M. Hickman (1925–1964), architect in Wichita and Frank Lloyd Wright disciple
John Edward Hickman (1883–1962), Justice of the Supreme Court of Texas

See also
Jonathan Hickman, American comic book writer and illustrator